"1 - 2 - 3" is a 1965 song recorded by American blue-eyed soul singer Len Barry, who also co-wrote it with John Madara and David White. The recording's chorus and accompaniment were arranged by Jimmy Wisner. The single was released in 1965 on the American Decca label. The writers were sued by Motown Records at the time, claiming that the song is a reworking of Holland-Dozier-Holland's "Ask Any Girl" released by The Supremes as the B-side to their single "Baby Love" the year before. They denied the claim, but after two years of litigation, agreed to give the Motown writers 15% of the song's writing and publishing royalties. Holland-Dozier-Holland are listed as co-authors by BMI.

The personnel on the original recording included Vinnie Bell, Bobby Eli, and Sal Ditroia on guitars; Joe Macho on bass; Artie Butler on percussion; Leon Huff on piano; Artie Kaplan on sax; Bill Tole and Roswell Rudd on trombones; Lee Morgan on trumpet; Fred Hubbard on clarinet; and Bobby Gregg on drums.

"1-2-3" reached number 2 in the US Billboard chart ("I Hear a Symphony" by The Supremes kept it from the number 1 spot). "1-2-3" also went to number 11 on the Billboard R&B chart. Overseas, the song peaked at number 3 on the UK Singles Chart.  In addition, it was also a Top 10 hit in Ireland, where it went to number 8.
It sold over 1.75 million copies, and was awarded a gold disc.

In 1988 the song was covered in a charity concert by George Michael featuring Deon Estus.

Chart performance

See also
 List of 1960s one-hit wonders in the United States
 List of Cash Box Top 100 number-one singles of 1965

References

External links
 Lyrics of this song
 

1965 singles
Al Stewart songs
Jan and Dean songs
Songs written by David White (musician)
Decca Records singles
1965 songs
Cashbox number-one singles
Songs written by John Medora
Brunswick Records singles
Songs written by Len Barry
Songs involved in plagiarism controversies